The 2022 Dominican Republic census is the tenth Dominican Republic national census, and was held from the 10 to 23 of November 2022, during the presidency of Luis Abinader. It was originally scheduled to conclude in 23 November, but, it was extended to the end of month due to work delays.

This is the first Dominican census to have an ethno-racial question since the 1960 Dominican Republic Census, and on section 6 people are able to choose between 
"black", "white", "indio", "mulato", "mestizo", "Asian", and "other".

Preparation
As required by law, the Dominican Republic census has been conducted every 10 years since 1920. The 2010 Dominican Republic census was the previous census completed.

Census sections
The census was divided into six sections.

Section I

Section II

Section III

Section IV

Section V

Section VI

See also 
 1920 Santo Domingo Census
 1950 Dominican Republic Census
 1960 Dominican Republic Census
 1970 Dominican Republic Census
 2010 Dominican Republic Census
 People of the Dominican Republic

References

External links
 National Bureau of Statistics

Dominican Republic
2022 in the Dominican Republic